Sick cell syndrome  is a medical condition characterised by reduced functioning of the cellular Na+/K+ pump, which is responsible for maintaining the internal ion homeostasis. The clinical result is a rise in blood K+ level and drop of blood Na+ levels

There are a wide range of possible pathological conditions that can cause sick cell syndrome, including:
 hypoxia
 sepsis
 hypovolaemia
 malnourishment
This syndrome is well known in the field of palliative medicine as many terminal patients develop this condition.

References

Red blood cell disorders